Center pivot irrigation in Saudi Arabia is typical of many isolated irrigation projects scattered throughout the arid and hyper-arid regions of the Earth. Nonrenewable fossil water is mined from depths as great as 1 km (3,000 ft), pumped to the surface, and distributed via large center pivot irrigation feeds. The circles of green irrigated vegetation may comprise a variety of agricultural commodities from alfalfa to wheat.

The projects often trace out a narrow, sinuous, and seemingly random path. Actually, engineers generally seek ancient river channels now buried by the sand seas. The fossil waters mined in these projects accumulated during periods of wetter climate in the Pleistocene glacial epochs, between 10,000 and 2 million years ago, and are not being replenished under current climatic conditions. The projects, therefore, will have limited production as the reservoirs are drained.

A network of dams has been built to trap and use precious seasonal floods. Vast underground water reservoirs have been tapped through deep wells. Desalination plants have been built to produce fresh water from the sea for urban and industrial use, thereby freeing other sources for agriculture. Facilities have also been put into place to treat urban and industrial run-off for agricultural irrigation. These efforts collectively have helped transform vast tracts of the desert into fertile farmland. Land under cultivation grew from under  in 1976 to more than 8 million acres (32,000 km²) in 1993.

Saudi Arabia is suffering from a major depletion of the water in its underground aquifers and a resultant break down and disintegration of its agriculture as a consequence. As a result of the catastrophe, Saudi Arabia has bought agricultural land in the United States, Argentina, and Africa. Saudi Arabia ranked as a major buyer of agricultural land in foreign countries.

See also

Desert farming
Peak water
Environmental impact of irrigation
Water politics in the Middle East

External links
Crop Circles in the Desert: Nasa Image of the Day

References

Agriculture in Saudi Arabia
Saudi Arabia
Irrigation